L'Alcora ( is a municipality in the comarca of Alcalatén, Valencian Community, Spain.

History
Traces of human presence in the area date from the Bronze Age. Also present are remains from the Iberian, Roman and Moorish ages, the latter including the castle, which gives the name to L'Alcora's comarca. The fortress was reconquered by the Christians in 1233, after which the current town started to expand at the expenses of the fortress's previous borough.

Main sights
Castle of Alcalatén (10th-13th centuries), a Moorish fortress later modified after the Christian conquest. It has an irregular triangular plan, with two large towers.
Hermitage of St. Vincent (1598)
Hermitage of St. Christopher (17th century)
Iberian settlement of Montmirá
Fortified hermitage of El Salvador
Museum of Ceramics (Royal Factory of Alcora faience)

References

External links
Page at the Touristi Guide of the Valencian Community 

Municipalities in the Province of Castellón
Alcalatén